Christophe Laudamiel (born 1969) is a French perfumer. He is co-founder and Master Perfumer of DreamAir creative studios in New York City, where he currently resides. In 2019 he was named Chief Perfumer to BélAir Lab in Tokyo: a perfume composition and technology studio newly managed by Rohto Pharmaceuticals. He is a founder and president of the non-profit Academy of Perfumery and Aromatics.

Education
After winning the French National Chemistry Olympiads in 1986, Laudamiel studies Mathematiques and Physics at Lycée Blaise Pascal in Clermont-Ferrand. After winning a Bronz Medal at the International Chemistry Olympiads in Helsinki, Finland 1988, he went on and graduated Valedictorian with a Master's degree in Chemistry from the European Higher Institute of Chemistry in Strasbourg, France. 1991. As a Procter & Gamble Teaching Fellow, he taught chemistry and started a PhD at the Massachusetts Institute of Technology in 1991. He dropped out of the PhD program after one year to become teaching assistant in Chemistry at Harvard University. In 1994 he joined the Procter & Gamble Creative Perfumery School in Newcastle-upon-Tyne (UK)  studying under Principle Perfumer Allan McRitchie and Senior Perfumer Christine Cahen . He received his creative perfumery degree in 1997 from the Procter & Gamble European Center in Brussels (Belgium) under the supervision of Principle Perfumer Robert Lecoq and Senior Perfumers Catherine Ganahl and Hugo Denutte. He was soon after promoted to Senior Perfumer by now Victor Mills' Society Master Perfumer Rafael Trujillo. In 1999, he received the Procter & Gamble Special Recognition Award for his work in fragrance creation, especially in fabric softeners, and for his discoveries of new fragrance molecules and technologies.

In 1999–2000, he briefly studied fine fragrance creation with Master Perfumer Pierre Bourdon, familiarizing himself with Cool Water, Goodlife, Dolce Vita and Féminité du Bois. 
In the year 2000, Laudamiel joined International Flavors & Fragrances in Manhattan where he polished his skills alongside perfumer legends Carlos Benaim, Sophia Grojsman and Pierre Wargnye.

Career
Laudamiel rapidly won projects on two of the most prestigious accounts at the time in New York City: Estee Lauder Companies' (Tommy Hilfiger Cool Spray for Woman, 2001) and Polo Blue for men, Ralph Lauren, which was co-created in 2001 with Carlos Benaim and launched in 2002. Polo Blue for men received the FIFI Award "Fragrance Star of the Year" in 2003. Polo Blue for men and Fierce (2002), another fragrance co-authored by Laudamiel and Benaim, were nearly a decade later, still in the top 10 best selling men's fragrances on the US market , some claimed they were in the top 5.

Laudamiel’s expertise has afforded him opportunities to participate as a judge on the juries of fragrance competitions. In 2003, he was a jury member for the Royal Fashion Institute in Antwerp, Belgium, and in 2004, he helped judge Gael magazine’s and Feeling magazine’s fragrances of the year. In April 2014, he was one of main judges for the Institute of Art and Olfaction (IAO) Fragrance Awards.

Osmography

Fine Fragrances

Scent Sculptures, Art Installations and Performances

Awards

Perfumery Awards

Scientific Awards

Publications 

 Laudamiel, C. (2007). Creative Processes in Perfumery. In F. Berthoud, F. Ghozland, & S. d’Auber (Eds.), Stakes & professions in perfumery (pp. 97–103). Toulouse, France: Editions d’Assalit.
 Laudamiel, C. (2009). Haute Perfumery and Haute Cuisine. In H. Blumenthal, The Fat Duck cookbook (pp. 478–482). London: Bloomsbury.
 Laudamiel, C., Hornetz, C., Braja, M., & Patel, S. (2008). From Virgin Education to Real Education. In P. Kraft & Royal Society of Chemistry (Great Britain); Society of Chemical Industry (Great Britain) (Eds.), Current topics in flavor and fragrance research (pp. 329–339). Weinheim; Chichester: Wiley-VCH.
 Laudamiel, C., Hornetz, C., Mookherjee, B. D., & Patel, S. (2008). From Virgin Education to Real Education. Chemistry & Biodiversity, 5(6), 1159–1169.
Laudamiel, C. (2010). Perfumery – The Wizardy of Volatile Molecules. In A. Herrmann (Ed.), The Chemistry and Biology of Volatiles (pp. 291–305). Chichester: Wiley.
Laudamiel, C. (2016). Liberté, Égalité, Fragrancité: a fragrance manifesto. https://d3ciwvs59ifrt8.cloudfront.net/feef7663-5ef9-49cf-872f-5ca23732cc29/9cbdfb91-27ac-4c56-8500-086d065a7eeb.pdf
Laudamiel, C., Tracy, S., & Doull, H. (2018). Fragrance Transparency: Natural vs Synthetics. Keap Matchbook Blog. Retrieved from https://www.keapbk.com/blogs/keap/fragrance-transparency-natural-vs-synthetic-perfumes-candles-scents-scented-better-safer-sustainable [Finalist, Perfumed Plume Award 2018, New York City]
Laudamiel, C., & Tracy, S. (2018). Fragrance Transparency: The incredible artistry behind the creation of a fragrance. Keap Matchbook Blog. Retrieved from https://www.keapbk.com/blogs/keap/fragrance-transparency-the-incredible-artistry-behind-the-creation-of-a-fragrance-green-market [Winner, Perfumed Plume Award 2018, New York City]
Parma, V., Ohla, K., Veldhuizen, M., ... Laudamiel, C. (2020). More Than Smell - COVID-19 Is Associated With Severe Impairment of Smell, Taste, and Chemesthesis. Chemical Senses, Vol. 45, (pp. 609–622).
Parma, V., Ohla, K., Veldhuizen, M., ... Laudamiel, C. (adv. access Dec 2020). Recent smell loss is the best predictor of COVID-19: a preregistered, cross-sectional study. Chemical Senses, 2021, Vol 46, 1–12
Ravia, A., Snitz, K., ... Laudamiel, C.,...Sobel N. (2020) A measure of smell enables the creation of olfactory metamers, Nature 588(7836):118-123.

References

 
 
 

   
 
 
IFRA UK. (2020). "A nose for discovery." Olfaction: A Journey. pp. 38–39.

 
 

1969 births
Living people
French perfumers